Emancipation Oak is a historic tree on the campus of Hampton University in what is now the City of Hampton, Virginia in the United States. The large sprawling southern live oak (Quercus virginiana), which is believed to be over 200 years old, is 98 feet (30 m) in diameter, with branches which extend upward as well as laterally. It is designated one of the 10 Great Trees of the World by the National Geographic Society and is part of the National Historic Landmark district of Hampton University.

History
During the American Civil War (1861 to 1865), Fort Monroe became a place of refuge for African American people escaping slavery.  The Union Army defined the people as contraband in order to provide  them asylum. Virginia law had prohibited the education of enslaved people following the Nat Turner slave rebellion in 1831.

In November 1861, the American Missionary Association asked Mary Smith Peake (1823 to 1862) to teach children of freedmen at the contraband camp related to Fort Monroe.(Jones-Wilson et al., 1996).  She was said to start her classes outside, under the tree. Peake was the first black teacher of the AMA, which expanded to support numerous educational institutions in the South.  Her base was 3 miles from the protective safety of Fort Monroe, but her classes also attracted adults at night. Soon the AMA provided the Brown Cottage for her classes.  She taught up to 50 children during the day and 20 adults at night.

In 1863, the Virginia Peninsula's black community gathered under the oak to hear the first Southern reading of President Abraham Lincoln's Emancipation Proclamation, leading to its nickname as the Emancipation Oak.

After the conclusion of hostilities, a school was founded here in 1868 by General Samuel C. Armstrong and the American Missionary Association as Hampton Normal and Agricultural Institute, a land grant school. From 1872 to 1875, one of its many students was Booker T. Washington, the son of a freedman.  He became a famous educator who founded Alabama's Tuskegee Institute in 1881.  In the early 20th century, collaborating with the philanthropist Julius Rosenwald, Washington and staff at the Tuskegee Institute helped to establish dozens of rural schools for African-American children across the South.

Hampton Normal and Agricultural Institute became Hampton Institute in 1930.  It gained university status in 1984, becoming Hampton University. It is one of Virginia's major institutions of higher education. In the 21st century, the Emancipation Oak still stands to provide both shelter and inspiration to the school's students and staff.

See also 
140th Year Anniversary Celebration of the Emancipation Proclamation
Mary Smith Peake
List of individual trees

References

History of Virginia
Individual oak trees
Hampton University
History of Hampton, Virginia
Military history of African Americans in the American Civil War
Tourist attractions in Hampton, Virginia
Historic district contributing properties in Virginia
Individual trees in the United States
National Register of Historic Places in Hampton, Virginia